Pseudoeurycea goebeli is a species of salamander in the family Plethodontidae.
It is found in Guatemala and Mexico.
It's natural habitat is subtropical or tropical moist montane forests. These salamanders live at an elevation of 2400–2900 meters in the cloud forest. Researchers have found that their mating and spermiogenesis do not depend on temporal changes like other salamanders in that area. Another unique fact about these specific salamanders is that even though they have mating opportunities throughout the year and they are active all year, they are seasonal egg-layers.
It is threatened by habitat loss.

References

2. Mathew Smita, Oommen V. Oommen, M. George Jancy, M.A. Akbarsha, Stages in spermatogenesis of two species of caecilians, Ichthyophis tricolor and Uraeotyphlus cf. narayani (Amphibia: Gymnophiona): Light and electron microscopic study, Journal of Morphology, 10.1002/jmor.10231, 261, 1, (92-104), (2004).

Sources

Pseudoeurycea
Taxonomy articles created by Polbot
Amphibians described in 1936